Word of God is a 2017 Danish drama film directed by Henrik Ruben Genz. It was shortlisted as one of the three films to be selected as the potential Danish submission for the Academy Award for Best Foreign Language Film at the 90th Academy Awards. However, You Disappear was selected as the Danish entry.

Cast
 Søren Malling as God / Uffe
 Marie Askehave as Epidemilæge
 Maria Erwolter as Josefine
 Mads Riisom as Hansi

References

External links
 

2017 films
2017 drama films
Danish drama films
Films directed by Henrik Ruben Genz
2010s Danish-language films